Piney Prospect, also known as the Sugg House, is a historic home located near Tarboro, Edgecombe County, North Carolina. The original house was built about 1800, and enlarged to its present size about 1820.  It is a two-story, rectangular, frame dwelling in the Early Republic style.  It features a four-bay, two-tiered recessed porch with three free standing and two engaged columns.  The interior has Adamesque design elements.  Also on the property is a large barn built about 1860.

It was listed on the National Register of Historic Places in 1971.

References

Houses on the National Register of Historic Places in North Carolina
Houses completed in 1820
Houses in Edgecombe County, North Carolina
National Register of Historic Places in Edgecombe County, North Carolina